Little Shop of Horrors is a horror comedy rock musical with music by Alan Menken and lyrics and a book by Howard Ashman. The story follows a hapless florist shop worker who raises a plant that feeds on human blood and flesh.  The musical is loosely based on the low-budget 1960 black comedy film The Little Shop of Horrors.  The music, composed by Menken in the style of early 1960s rock and roll, doo-wop and early Motown, includes several well-known tunes, including the title song, "Skid Row (Downtown)", "Somewhere That's Green", and "Suddenly, Seymour".

The musical premiered Off-Off-Broadway in 1982 before moving to the Orpheum Theatre Off-Broadway, where it had a five-year run.  It later received numerous productions in the U.S. and abroad, and a subsequent Broadway production. Because of its small cast, it has become popular with community theatre, school and other amateur groups.  The musical was also made into a 1986 film of the same name, directed by Frank Oz.

Synopsis

Act I
A trio of 1960s street urchins named Crystal, Ronette, and Chiffon set the scene ("Little Shop of Horrors") and comment on the action throughout the show. Seymour Krelborn is a poor young man, an orphan living in an urban skid row. Audrey is a pretty blonde with a fashion sense that leans towards the tacky. They lament their stations in life and the urban blight in their neighborhood ("Skid Row (Downtown)"). They are co-workers at a run-down flower shop owned and operated by the cranky Mr. Mushnik. After a sudden eclipse of the sun, Seymour finds a mysterious plant that looks like a large venus flytrap ("Da-Doo"). Seymour, who is secretly in love with Audrey, names the plant Audrey II in her honor.

The plant does not thrive in its new environment and appears to be dying, though Seymour takes very good care of it. He accidentally pricks his finger on a rose thorn, which draws blood, and Audrey II's pod opens thirstily. Seymour realizes that Audrey II requires blood to survive and allows the plant to suckle from his finger ("Grow For Me"). As Audrey II grows, it becomes an attraction and starts generating brisk business for Mushnik. As the caretaker of the plant, the timid Seymour is suddenly regarded as a hero ("Ya Never Know"), while Audrey secretly longs to leave her abusive boyfriend. Her dream is to lead an ideal suburban life with Seymour, complete with a tract home, frozen dinners, and plastic on the furniture ("Somewhere That's Green").

Meanwhile, the employees at Mushnik's are sprucing up the flower shop because of the popularity of the rapidly growing Audrey II and the revenue that it is bringing in ("Closed for Renovation").  Audrey's abusive boyfriend, Orin Scrivello, a sadistic dentist ("Dentist!"), encourages Seymour to take the plant and get out of Skid Row. Realizing that his store's sudden profitability is completely dependent on the plant (and therefore on Seymour), Mushnik takes advantage of Seymour's innocence by offering to adopt him and make him a full partner in the business ("Mushnik and Son"). Seymour accepts, even though Mushnik treats him poorly. When Seymour, running out of blood, stops feeding the plant, Audrey II demands blood and promises that, if fed, it will make sure that all of Seymour's dreams come true ("Feed Me (Git It)").

Seymour sets up a late-night appointment with Orin, intending to kill him. However, Seymour loses his nerve and decides not to commit the crime. Unfortunately for Orin, who is getting high on nitrous oxide, the gas device is stuck in the "on" position, and he suffocates while asking Seymour to save him. Seymour cannot bring himself to shoot Orin but lets him die of asphyxiation ("Now (It's Just The Gas)"). Seymour feeds Orin's body to the now huge Audrey II, and the plant consumes it with ravenous glee ("Act I Finale").

Act II

The flower shop is much busier, and Seymour and Audrey have trouble keeping up with the onslaught of orders ("Call Back in the Morning"). Audrey confides to Seymour that she feels guilty about Orin's disappearance, because secretly she wished it. The two admit their feelings for one another, and Seymour promises that he will protect and care for Audrey from now on ("Suddenly, Seymour").

Before they can go, Mushnik confronts Seymour about Orin's death. Seymour denies killing Orin, but Mushnik wants him to give a statement to the police, who have begun investigating. Audrey II tells Seymour that he has to be rid of Mushnik or he will lose everything, including Audrey ("Suppertime"). Seymour tells Mushnik that he put the days' receipts inside Audrey II for safekeeping. Mushnik climbs inside the plant's gaping maw to search for the money and screams as he is devoured. Seymour now runs the flower shop, and reporters, salesmen, lawyers and agents approach him, promising him fame and fortune. Seymour realizes that it is only a matter of time before Audrey II will kill again and that he is morally responsible, but he does nothing ("The Meek Shall Inherit").

As Seymour works on his speech for a lecture tour, Audrey II again squalls for blood.  Seymour threatens to kill it just as Audrey walks in asking when Mushnik will return from visiting his "sick sister". Seymour learns that Audrey would still love him without the fame and decides that Audrey II must die after the scheduled LIFE magazine interview at the shop. Audrey is confused and frightened by Seymour's ramblings, but she runs home by his order.

That night, unable to sleep and distressed by Seymour's strange behavior, Audrey goes to the flower shop to talk with him. He is not there, and Audrey II begs her to water him. Not sensing the danger, she approaches to water it, and a vine pulls her into the plant's gaping maw ("Sominex/Suppertime II"). Seymour arrives and pulls her out, but Audrey is mortally wounded.  Her dying wish is for Seymour to feed her to the plant after she dies so that they can always be together. She dies in his arms, and he reluctantly honors her request ("Somewhere That's Green" (reprise)). Seymour falls asleep as Audrey II grows small red flower buds.

The next day, Patrick Martin from the World Botanical Enterprises tells Seymour that his company wishes to sell leaf cuttings of Audrey II in florist shops across America. Seymour realizes the plant's evil plan: world conquest. He tries shooting, cutting, and poisoning the plant, but it has grown too hardy to kill. Seymour, in desperation, runs into its open jaws with a machete planning to kill it from the inside, but he is quickly eaten. Patrick, Crystal, Ronette, and Chiffon search for Seymour. Not finding him, Patrick tells the girls to take the cuttings.

Crystal, Ronette, and Chiffon relate that, following these events, other plants appeared across America, tricking innocent people into feeding them blood in exchange for fame and fortune. Audrey II, bigger than ever, appears with opened new flowers revealing the faces of Seymour, Audrey, Mushnik and Orin, who beg that the plants must not be fed ("Finale Ultimo: Don't Feed the Plants"). Audrey II slithers towards the audience threateningly.

Early productions

Off-Broadway
The musical had its world premiere Off-Off-Broadway on May 6, 1982, at the Workshop of the Players Art Foundation (WPA Theatre), playing there until June 6, 1982.  It opened Off-Broadway at the Orpheum Theatre in Manhattan's East Village on July 27, 1982. The production, directed by Ashman, with musical staging by Edie Cowan, was critically acclaimed and won several awards including the 1982–1983 Drama Desk Award for Outstanding Musical, as well as the New York Drama Critics Circle Award for Best Musical and the Outer Critics Circle Award. Howard Ashman wrote, in the introduction to the acting edition of the libretto, that the show "satirizes many things: science fiction, 'B' movies, musical comedy itself, and even the Faust legend". The cast starred Lee Wilkof as Seymour, Ellen Greene as Audrey, Hy Anzell as Mr. Mushnik, Franc Luz as Orin and the other small roles, Leilani Jones was a replacement as Chiffon, Ron Taylor as the voice of Audrey II, and Martin P. Robinson as the Audrey II puppeteer.

The production ran for five years. When it closed on November 1, 1987, after 2,209 performances, it was the third-longest running musical and the highest-grossing production in Off-Broadway history.  Though a Broadway transfer had been proposed for the production, book writer Howard Ashman felt the show belonged where it was.  Since it was not produced on Broadway, the original production was ineligible for the 1982 Tony Awards.  The producers were the WPA Theatre, David Geffen, Cameron Mackintosh and the Shubert Organization.  The Audrey II puppets were designed and operated by Martin P. Robinson.

An original cast recording, released in 1982, omitted the songs "Call Back in the Morning" and the reprise of "Somewhere That's Green", and had abridged versions of "Now (It's Just the Gas)," "Mushnik and Son," and "The Meek Shall Inherit". It also shifted the location of the song "Closed for Renovation," appearing in the show after "Somewhere That's Green" while appearing on the cast album after "Now (It's Just the Gas)" to serve as an upbeat bridge from Orin's death to the Act II love ballad, "Suddenly, Seymour". The recording features Leilani Jones, who replaced Marlene Danielle as Chiffon two weeks after the musical opened.

West End
A London West End production opened on October 12, 1983, at the Comedy Theatre, produced by Cameron Mackintosh. It ran for 813 performances, starring Barry James as Seymour, Greene reprising her role as Audrey and Harry Towb as Mr. Mushnik, with Sinitta (then surnamed Renet) understudying Chiffon, Crystal and Ronette. Zeeteah Massiah took over as Chiffon in 1984. Greene was replaced as Audrey by Claire Moore (1984) then Sarah Payne (1985). Orin was played by Terence Hillyer (1983), David Burt (1984) and Bogdan Kominowski (1985). Audrey II was puppeteered by Anthony Asbury, and the costumes were designed by Tim Goodchild. It received the 1983 Evening Standard Award for Best Musical and closed on October 5, 1985.

Australia and Canada
An Australian production opened at Her Majesty's Theatre, Perth on January 14, 1984, starring Christopher Pate as Seymour and Denise Kirby as Audrey. It then moved to the Theatre Royal in Sydney from November 7, 1984, and the Comedy Theatre in Melbourne from February, 1985.

A 1985 Canadian production starred Sheila McCarthy as Audrey and Michael Crossman as Seymour. Gerry Salsberg was Orin.

Musical numbers

 Act I
 Prologue ("Little Shop of Horrors") – Chiffon, Crystal, and Ronette
 "Skid Row (Downtown)" – Company
 "Da-Doo" – Chiffon, Crystal, and Ronette (with Seymour speaking)
 "Grow for Me" – Seymour
 "Ya Never Know" – Mushnik, Chiffon, Crystal, Ronette, and Seymour
 "Somewhere That's Green" – Audrey
 "Closed for Renovation" – Seymour, Audrey, and Mushnik
 "Dentist!" – Orin, Chiffon, Crystal, and Ronette
 "Mushnik and Son" – Mushnik and Seymour
 "Sudden Changes" – Seymour
 "Feed Me (Git It)" – Audrey II and Seymour
 "Now (It's Just the Gas)" – Orin and Seymour
 "Coda (Act I Finale)" – Chiffon, Crystal, Ronette, and Audrey II

Act II
 "Call Back in the Morning" – Seymour and Audrey
 "Suddenly, Seymour" – Seymour, Audrey, Chiffon, Crystal, and Ronette
 "Suppertime" – Audrey II (with Seymour and Mushnik speaking)
 "The Meek Shall Inherit" – Company
 "Sominex/Suppertime II" – Audrey and Audrey II
 "Somewhere That's Green" (reprise) – Audrey (with Seymour speaking)
 "Finale Ultimo (Don't Feed the Plants)" – Company

Casts

Notable replacements 
Off-Broadway (1982–87)
Seymour: Stuart Zagnit
Audrey: Annie Golden, Faith Prince

West End (1984–85)
Chiffon: Zeeteah Massiah

Broadway (2003–04)
Seymour: Joey Fatone
Orin Scrivello: Rob Evan

Off-Broadway (2019– )
Seymour: Gideon Glick, Jeremy Jordan, Conrad Ricamora, Skylar Astin, Rob McClure, Matt Doyle
Audrey: Lena Hall, Maude Apatow
Orin Scrivello: Bryce Pinkham, Drew Gehling
Mr. Mushnik: Stuart Zagnit, Brad Oscar

Differences between the 1960 film and stage musical

The musical is based on the basic concept and dark comic tone of the 1960 film, although it changes much of the story.  The setting is moved from Skid Row, Los Angeles to Skid Row in New York. Seymour's hypochondriacal Jewish mother is omitted in the musical, and Seymour becomes an orphan in the care of Mushnik. Also dropped is the subplot involving the two investigating police officers.  The characters of Mrs. Siddie Shiva and Burson Fouch are also omitted, although Mrs. Shiva is mentioned as being the shop's biggest funeral account. The gleefully masochistic dental patient, originally played by Jack Nicholson, is not in the musical but is in the 1986 film, played by Bill Murray.

In the musical, the sadistic dentist, Orin Scrivello, is killed by suffocation from laughing gas instead of being stabbed with a dental instrument as in the film.  His abusive relationship with Audrey is added to the musical to give Seymour a motive to kill him.  In the film, Seymour murders several innocent bystanders, and Mushnik tricks a thief into looking for money inside the plant, which eats the thief.  In the musical, Seymour tricks Mushnik in the same way when Mushnik plans to turn Seymour over to the police.  The two neighborhood girls in the film are replaced in the musical by a chorus of three street urchins: Crystal, Chiffon and Ronette, named after (and reminiscent of) girl groups of the 1960s.  The plant is named "Audrey II" in the musical, rather than the film's "Audrey Junior", and instead of being a crossbreed of a butterwort and a Venus Flytrap, in the musical it is a creature from outer space intent on taking over the world.

Perhaps the biggest difference is the ending.  The musical ends with Orin, Mushnik, Audrey and Seymour all eaten by the plant, and the three girls report that Audrey II's progeny continues to consume people.  In the 1960 film, Mushnik and Audrey survive,  and the plant's carnivorous activities are discovered when its flowers bloom with the faces of its victims, including Seymour, imprinted on them.  The musical references this ending in its finale, in which the Plant's four victims' faces are seen in its blooming flowers.

The change in ending of the musical contributes to its portrayal of class struggles and moral values. While the 1986 film shows Seymour and Audrey escaping to the dream suburban house, encapsulating ideals of the 1950s American Dream, the musical hints to a metaphorical portrayal of Seymour's greed as the plant. Seymour's greed gradually consumes himself and Audrey. The musical engages with ideas relating to human values in the face of capitalist culture, disempowering those who are enveloped with motivations of personal monetary gain and overlook moral values. It serves as a social commentary of commodity fetishism.

Subsequent productions

2003 tryout, Broadway and 2004 tour
In 2003, an $8 million revival of Little Shop of Horrors was planned with the goal of opening on Broadway. A pre-Broadway production debuted at the Miracle Theatre in Coral Gables, Florida on May 16, 2003. Lee Wilkof, who originated the role of Seymour in 1982, was cast as Mr. Mushnik. The production was directed by Wilkof's wife, Connie Grappo, who was the assistant to Howard Ashman during the original production. Martin P. Robinson, who designed the original Audrey II puppets, enlisted fellow puppeteers and builders from The Jim Henson Company to create and operate new puppets for the show, ranging from the smallest plant (operated solely by Robinson) to the largest (requiring three additional puppeteers to fully control). Hunter Foster and Alice Ripley played Seymour and Audrey, and Billy Porter was the voice of Audrey II.

Critics complained that by expanding the show to fit a larger theatre, its intimacy was lost; they also judged several actors as miscast, although the Miami Herald declared that "Alice Ripley's Audrey – part lisping Kewpie doll (a la Ellen Greene, who originated the role), part dental punching bag – is heartbreakingly adorable." In June 2003, the producers announced that the Broadway production was cancelled. Nevertheless, within weeks, they ousted Grappo in favor of veteran Broadway director Jerry Zaks, who fired everyone in the cast, except Foster, and redirected the production from scratch. New casting was announced in July.

The musical made its Broadway debut at the Virginia Theatre on October 2, 2003, with Foster as Seymour, Kerry Butler as Audrey, Rob Bartlett as Mr. Mushnik, Douglas Sills as Orin, Michael-Leon Wooley as the voice of Audrey II and DeQuina Moore as Chiffon. Although this was the first time it had played on Broadway, the show's success in film and numerous regional productions made it fall under the "Revival" category for the 2003 Tony Awards.  Foster was nominated for the 2004 Tony Award for Best Actor in a Musical for his performance. The revival was fairly faithful to the original 1982 production. Changes included the expanded version of the title song heard in the 1986 film, and expanded "You Never Know" with a "WSKID" radio introduction, and a revised Act I Finale and added Entr'acte before "Call Back in the Morning." The orchestrations were beefed up for the bigger theatre to add reeds, trumpets and percussion to the original 5-piece combo.

The cast album was released on October 21, 2003. Demo recordings to five songs ("A Little Dental Music", "The Worse He Treats Me", "We'll Have Tomorrow", "Bad" and "I Found a Hobby") cut during the development process of the musical were included as bonus material for the album. The production closed on August 22, 2004, after 40 previews and 372 regular performances. The closing Broadway cast included Joey Fatone as Seymour.

On August 10, 2004, a U.S. national tour of the Broadway production began, with Anthony Rapp starring as Seymour, Tari Kelly as Audrey and Lenny Wolpe as Mushnik. The tour closed April 16, 2006 in Columbus, Ohio.

2006 Menier Chocolate Factory and 2007 West End

A production began previews on November 17, 2006, at the Menier Chocolate Factory. This revival, directed by Matthew White, featured a new Audrey II designed by David Farley, resembling the pitcher plant. The production was a critical and commercial success and transferred to the Duke of York's Theatre in London's West End in March 2007. In June 2007, the show transferred to the Ambassadors Theatre, where it ended its run on September 8, 2007. The West End cast featured Paul Keating as Seymour, Sheridan Smith as Audrey, Alistair McGowan as Orin, and Mike McShane providing the voice of Audrey II. Barry James, who portrayed Seymour in the original West End production, was Mr. Mushnik. Smith and McGowan received 2008 Laurence Olivier Award nominations, and the production was nominated for Best Musical Revival.

2009 UK tour
The Menier Chocolate Factory production toured the UK in 2009 with a cast including Damian Humbley as Seymour, Clare Buckfield as Audrey, Alex Ferns as Orin, Sylvester McCoy as Mr Mushnik and Clive Rowe as the voice of Audrey II.

2015 Encores!
A three-performance Encores! concert staging at New York City Center as part of its Off-Center series ran in July 2015. Directed by Dick Scanlan, the production starred  Jake Gyllenhaal as Seymour, and Ellen Greene reprising her role as Audrey. Taran Killam  played Orin, with Tracy Nicole Chapman, Marva Hicks and Ramona Keller as the urchins. Joe Grifasi was Mr. Mushnik, with Eddie Cooper as the plant.  Reviewers praised Greene, Gyllenhaal and the cast in general. Ben Brantley wrote in The New York Times: "A confluence of alchemical elements was at work, converging in ways that made a perfectly charming but small musical feel like a major event."

2016 Australian Tour
An Australian tour opened at the Hayes Theatre in Sydney on February 22, 2016, before touring to Her Majesty's Theatre, Adelaide; The Comedy Theatre, Melbourne; Canberra Theatre Centre; Queensland Performing Arts Centre, Brisbane, and The Roslyn Packer Theatre, Sydney.  It starred Brent Hill as Seymour, Esther Hannaford as Audrey, Tyler Coppin as Mushnik and Scott Johnson as Orin. Hill also voiced Audrey II. The production was directed by Dean Bryant and choreographed by Andy Hallwsorth The production was nominated for ten Sydney Theatre Awards, winning eight, including Best Production of a Musical, and five Helpmann Awards, winning none. Cassie Tongue wrote of it in The Guardian: "Watching this show feels like a discovery, or a reaffirmation; to be reminded why musical theatre matters, to be assured that musicals are a difficult, exhilarating art. And all this from a campy cult classic. What magic."

2016 UK Tour
A UK tour began on August 4, 2016, directed by Tara Wilkinson, starring Sam Lupton as Seymour, Stephanie Clift as Audrey and Rhydian Roberts as Orin. It was booked through November 26, 2016.

2018 Regent's Park Open Air Theatre 
A revival at London's Regent's Park Open Air Theatre, from 3 August to 22 September 2018, was directed by Maria Aberg, choreographed by Lizzi Gee and designed by Tom Scutt. It starred Marc Antolin as Seymour, Jemima Rooper as Audrey, Forbes Masson as Mr Mushnik, Matt Willis as Orin and American drag performer Vicky Vox as Audrey II. The production included the song "Mean Green Mother from Outer Space", written for the 1986 film, as an encore number.

2019 American revivals 
An Off-Broadway revival at the Westside Theatre began previews on September 17, 2019, with an official opening on October 17, 2019. The cast starred Jonathan Groff as Seymour (Gideon Glick replaced him from November 5–17 and from January 21 to March 11, 2020), Tammy Blanchard as Audrey, Christian Borle as Orin and Tom Alan Robbins as Mr. Mushnik. Michael Mayer directed, with choreography by Ellenore Scott. The lighting designer was Bradley King. The plant for this production was voiced by Kingsley Leggs. A cast album was released digitally on December 20, 2019. The production suspended performances on March 11, 2020, because of the COVID-19 pandemic, and reopened on September 21, 2021, with Jeremy Jordan as Seymour; Mayer, Scott, Blanchard, Borle and Robbins returned. The cast album received a physical release on the day of reopening. Some performances were cancelled, due to the pandemic, off and on during December 2021. Replacements in the role of Seymour have since included Conrad Ricamora, Skylar Astin and Rob McClure. Matt Doyle assumed the role in November 2022. Drew Gehling joined the cast as Orin in March 2023.

Pasadena Playhouse staged a production from September 17 to October 20, 2019, directed by Mike Donahue. The cast included George Salazar as Seymour, Michaela Jaé Rodriguez as Audrey, Amber Riley as Audrey II, Kevin Chamberlin as Mr. Mushnik and Matthew Wilkas as Orin.

Audrey II puppets
The character of Audrey II is described as being "An anthropomorphic cross between a Venus flytrap and an avocado. It has a huge, nasty-looking pod that gains a shark-like aspect when open and snapping at food. The creature is played by a series of increasing[ly] large puppets".

In productions, the first puppet is a small potted plant "less than one foot tall" held by the actor portraying Seymour.  He manipulates the plant himself with his hand and then sets it down, where it is moved by an unseen hand from beneath a shelf.  The second puppet is slightly larger than the first and is operated by Seymour during the song "You Never Know".  A fake arm in a sleeve matching Seymour's jacket is attached to the plant's pot, while the actor's real arm operates the plant.  The third puppet sits on the floor and is large enough to hide a person inside, who moves the plant's mouth in sync with Audrey II's voice, which is supplied by an offstage actor on a microphone.  The puppeteer's legs are clad in green tights with "leaf" shoes that serve as part of the plant's tendrils.  In Act II, the largest puppet again hides an actor inside, who manipulates the puppet's mouth and often some of its branches.  By this point, the head is at least six feet long and capable of "swallowing" characters.  For the finale, additions can be made to make the plant appear taller and even bigger. Actors and stage hands are often used to move larger branches and roots, which, in the original off-Broadway production, spilled off the stage and into the audience. In some productions, dangling vines over the house enhance the effect of Audrey II menacing the audience.

Amateur productions of Little Shop of Horrors receive designs for building the puppets from MTI, as part of the rental scripts and scores, based on the original Martin P. Robinson designs.  Some companies who have produced the show in the past and built their own puppets rent them out to other companies to recoup some of their construction costs.

Adaptations

1986 feature film

A film version of the musical was made in 1986.  Directed by Frank Oz and noted as the only film written by Howard Ashman, it starred Rick Moranis as Seymour, Ellen Greene as Audrey, Vincent Gardenia as Mr. Mushnik, Steve Martin as Orin Scrivello, DDS, and the voice of Levi Stubbs as Audrey II. Bill Murray played the small comic role of the masochist, Arthur Denton.  The 1986 film follows the plot of the musical closely but omits the songs "Ya Never Know" (rewritten as "Some Fun Now," a trio for Crystal, Ronette and Chiffon), "Mushnik and Son", "Now (It's Just the Gas)", "Sudden Changes," "Closed for Renovation" and "Call Back in the Morning"; the final cut ending also omits "Finale Ultimo (Don't Feed The Plants)".  Other changes include the removal of Mr. Mushnik's adoption proposition and a new ending, in which Seymour is able to save Audrey from Audrey II and then electrocutes the plant after it has destroyed the shop. Seymour and Audrey marry and move to the tract home of her dreams, but a small Audrey II-type bud is seen in their garden, which portends a possible spread of the alien plants.  An ending more faithful to the stage version was filmed, in which the plant eats Audrey and Seymour and then, having grown to massive size and reproduced, goes on a King Kong-style rampage through New York City.  It was received poorly by test audiences, and the upbeat alternate ending was used for the theatrical cut. In October 2012, the original ending was restored and released with the film as "The Director's Cut" on DVD and Blu-ray. A new song for Audrey II, "Mean Green Mother from Outer Space", was nominated for an Academy Award for Best Original Song.

Cancelled film remake
Development of a feature film remake was announced in 2016, with Greg Berlanti directing and Matthew Robinson penning the screenplay. Berlanti, David Geffen and Marc Platt were set to serve as producers. By 2020, Taron Egerton, Chris Evans and Scarlett Johansson had entered into negotiations to star as Seymour, Orin and Audrey, respectively, while Billy Porter was cast in the role of Audrey II. In September 2022, Egerton stated that the film was "dormant" due to factors including the COVID-19 pandemic.

Awards and nominations

Notes

References
Ganzl, Kurt. The Encyclopedia of the Musical Theatre: 2nd Edition. Schirmer Books, 2001
Kennedy P., Michael & John Muir. Musicals. HarperCollins Publishers, 1997.

External links

 
 
 Little Shop of Horrors at the Music Theatre International website

Little Shop of Horrors
1982 musicals
Off-Broadway musicals
Broadway musicals
Musicals based on films
Musicals by Alan Menken
Plays featuring puppetry
Rock musicals
Science fiction musicals
Plays set in the United States
Plays set in New York City
Musicals by Howard Ashman